Antonio Mancini (14 November 1852 – 28 December 1930) was an Italian painter.

Biography

Mancini was born in Rome and showed precocious ability as an artist. At the age of twelve, he was admitted to the Institute of Fine Arts in Naples, where he studied under Domenico Morelli (1823–1901), a painter of historical scenes who favored dramatic chiaroscuro and vigorous brushwork, and Filippo Palizzi. Mancini developed quickly under their guidance, and in 1872, he exhibited two paintings at the Paris Salon.

Mancini worked at the forefront of the Verismo movement, an indigenous Italian response to 19th-century Realist aesthetics. His usual subjects included children of the poor, juvenile circus performers, and musicians he observed in the streets of Naples. His portrait of a young acrobat in Il Saltimbanco (1877–78) captures the fragility of the boy whose impoverished childhood is spent entertaining pedestrian crowds.

While in Paris in the 1870s, Mancini met the Impressionist painters Edgar Degas and Édouard Manet. He became friends with John Singer Sargent, who famously pronounced him to be the greatest living painter. His mature works show a brightened palette with a striking impasto technique on canvas and a bold command of pastels on paper.

In 1881, Mancini suffered a disabling mental illness. He settled in Rome in 1883 for twenty years, then moved to Frascati where he lived until 1918. During this period of Mancini's life, he was often destitute and relied on the help of friends and art buyers to survive. After the First World War, his living situation stabilized and he achieved a new level of serenity in his work. Mancini died in Rome in 1930 and was buried in the Basilica Santi Bonifacio e Alessio on the Aventine Hill.

His painting The Poor Schoolboy, exhibited in the Salon of 1876, is in the Musée d'Orsay of Paris. Its realist subject matter and dark palette are typical of his early work. Paintings by Mancini also may be seen in Galleria Nazionale d'Arte Moderna e Contemporanea in Rome, the Museo Civico-Galleria d'Arte Moderna in Turin, and other galleries in Italy.

The first exhibition in the U.S. devoted exclusively to Mancini's work was at the Philadelphia Museum of Art, October 20, 2007 – January 20, 2008, a museum which owns fifteen oil paintings and three pastels by Mancini that were a gift of New York City art dealer Vance N. Jordan.

Gallery

References
Ulrich W. Hiesinger (2007). "Antonio Mancini: Nineteenth-Century Italian Master" (Philadelphia Museum of Art), Yale University Press. 
Broude, Norma (1987). The Macchiaioli: Italian Painters of the Nineteenth Century. New Haven and London: Yale University Press. 
http://www.philamuseum.org

External links

Biography: Portrait of a young girl
Selected works in Academic Classicism
Short biography
Notes for 2008 Exhibition notes at the Philadelphia Museum of Art
Tumultuous Mind, Spread Across Canvas by Roberta Smith, The New York Times, Art Review, 4 Jan 2008

1852 births
1930 deaths
19th-century Italian painters
Italian male painters
20th-century Italian painters
Members of the Royal Academy of Italy
Painters from Naples
Accademia di Belle Arti di Napoli alumni
19th-century Italian male artists
20th-century Italian male artists